Raymond Frederick Katt (May 9, 1927 – October 19, 1999) was an American professional baseball player and coach. He played as a catcher in Major League Baseball during the 1950s, and later became the longtime and highly successful head baseball coach of Texas Lutheran University. He attended Texas A&M University.

Playing career
Katt spent his entire Major League playing career with two teams, the New York Giants and the St. Louis Cardinals, spending two separate terms with each club. Katt originally signed with the Giants and after two brief trials with them in 1952–53, he became the club's semi-regular backstop during its final championship season in New York in 1954. Playing in 86 games, he split catching duties with veteran Wes Westrum, hitting .255 with nine home runs and 33 runs batted in.

That year, he set a Major League record with four passed balls in one inning, catching knuckleballer Hoyt Wilhelm.    The record was later tied by Gino Petralli of the Texas Rangers in 1987, catching knuckleballer Charlie Hough, and by Ryan Lavarnway of the Boston Red Sox in 2013, catching  knuckleballer Steve Wright in Wright's first big-league start.

Westrum took over the catching during the 1954 World Series, won by the Giants in four consecutive games, and Katt did not appear. However, in 1955, he became the club's regular receiver, playing in 124 games and compiling a career-high 326 at bats, but his batting average plummeted to .215 and he spent the rest of his MLB career as a back-up.

He was first traded to the Cardinals on June 14, 1956, in a nine-player trade that included notables Alvin Dark and Red Schoendienst, and batted a creditable .259 in part-time duty for the Redbirds through the end of the 1956 season. During the winter, though, St. Louis shipped him to the Chicago Cubs, who in turn peddled him back to the Giants on the eve of the 1957 regular season. Katt was a member of the final New York Giants club before it transferred to San Francisco, batting 165 times in 72 games in 1957. He was traded back to the Cardinals in April 1958, and closed out his active MLB career with them as a third-string catcher in 1958 and a playing coach in 1959. In all or parts of eight major league seasons (1952–59), Katt appeared in 417 games, and batted .232 with 32 home runs and 120 runs batted in for 1,071 at bats.

Coaching career
Katt was a bullpen coach for the Cardinals from 1959 through June 15, 1960, and first-base coach for the Cleveland Indians in 1962. In between, he managed the Triple-A Portland Beavers for the final eight weeks of the 1961 season.

He then returned to Texas — first as a high school baseball coach in New Braunfels, and then as head baseball coach at Texas Lutheran, where he served for 22 seasons (1971–92), the team compiling a record of 502–362–2. Katt-Isbel Field, home of the college's baseball team, is named in his honor.

Katt died at age 72 from lymphoma in New Braunfels.

See also
 List of St. Louis Cardinals coaches

References

 Obituary

Sources
 Baseball Reference (MLB)
 Baseball Reference (MiLB)
 1951–52 Habana (Liga Profesional Cubana)
 1953–54 Magallanes (Liga Venezolana de Béisbol Profesional)
 Retrosheet
 Van Hyning, Thomas (1999). The Santurce Crabbers : Sixty Seasons of Puerto Rican Winter League Baseball. McFarland & Company. 
 Texas Lutheran University Hall of Honor

1927 births
1999 deaths
Baseball coaches from Texas
Baseball players from Texas
Buffalo Bisons (minor league) players
Cangrejeros de Santurce (baseball) players
Cleveland Indians coaches
College baseball coaches
Deaths from cancer in Texas
Deaths from lymphoma
Habana players
Jacksonville Jax players
Liga de Béisbol Profesional Roberto Clemente catchers
Major League Baseball bullpen coaches
Major League Baseball catchers
Major League Baseball first base coaches
Minneapolis Millers (baseball) players
Navegantes del Magallanes players
American expatriate baseball players in Venezuela
New York Giants (NL) players
People from New Braunfels, Texas
Portland Beavers managers
Portland Beavers players
Rochester Red Wings players
Sportspeople from New Braunfels, Texas
St. Cloud Rox players
St. Louis Cardinals coaches
St. Louis Cardinals players
Sioux City Soos players
Texas A&M Aggies baseball players
Texas Lutheran Bulldogs baseball coaches
Trenton Giants players
Tulsa Oilers (baseball) players
American expatriate baseball players in Cuba